Eupithecia egena is a moth in the family Geometridae. It is found in China, India and Nepal. The species flies from mid-July to mid-September at an altitude between 1800 and 4000 meters above sea level. 

Adults have grey-brown forewings and off-white hindwings. It resembles Eupithecia lasciva, but is larger. In addition, Eupithecia lasciva has an ochreous red patch in the distal area of the forewing and indistinct transverse lines, whereas in Eupithecia egena, the transverse lines are much more distinct and the red patch is smaller or entirely absent.

References

Moths described in 1984
egena
Moths of Asia